Greystone Hotel may refer to:

Greystone Miami Beach, 1939 art deco hotel in Miami Beach, Florida, known also as "Greystone Hotel"
The Greystone, building in Upper West Side, Manhattan, New York, known also as "Greystone Hotel"
Greystone Hotels, a hotel and hospitality company based in California, or its line of 10 hotels
Greystone Lodge, hotel in Gatlinburg, Tennessee